Evidence is the fourth studio album by American Christian musician Josh Baldwin. The album was released on October 2, 2020, by Bethel Music. The album was produced by Ed Cash, David Leonard, Brad King and Seth Talley.

The album was supported by the release of the title track, "Evidence," and "Into the Wild" as singles. "Evidence" peaked at No. 7 on the US Hot Christian Songs chart. The album debuted at No. 41 on the Top Christian Albums Chart in the United States.

Background
In an interview with American Songwriter, Baldwin explained that the creative process of producing the album began with the release of the single "Stand in Your Love" in 2018, shifting his perspective on the implicit pressure to produce of making music that did not represent his North Carolinian roots. Baldwin explained the process, saying:

Release and promotion

Singles
On June 1, 2020, Bethel Music had announced via Daily Play MPE that "Evidence" would be Josh Baldwin's next single, with the song slated to impact Christian radio on July 3, 2020. On June 12, 2020, Baldwin released a new single titled "Evidence" as the lead single from the album. "Evidence" peaked at No. 7 on the US Hot Christian Songs chart. Baldwin released the radio-adapted version of "Into the Wild" on May 7, 2021, as the second single from the album.

Promotional singles
On September 16, 2020, Bethel Music announced that Evidence would be released on October 2, 2020, and the release of "Into the Wild" was as the next single would slated on September 18, 2020. "Into the Wild" was subsequently released as the album's first promotional single. On September 25, 2020, Baldwin released "New Creations" as the second promotional single from the album.

Critical reception

In a positive review from 365 Days of Inspiring Media, Joshua Andre lauded Baldwin, describing the album as "a thoroughly enjoyable project that just may become better and better with each listen." Jesus Freak Hideout's Alex Caldwell stated in his review of the album: "Evidence may not be as wild as its title may suggest, but it's a great step forward for this up-and-coming songwriter and a good bit of evidence that worship music can be as varied and interesting as the geography that the writer comes from. Worship is both a deeply personal and corporate exercise all at the same time, and Evidence is a good case for both sides." Timothy Yap of JubileeCast stated in his review of the album: "Like many singer-songwriters, it's quite a challenge to record an album's worth of A class material, so there are bound to be fillers.  Nevertheless, there are still some outstanding entries worth checking out."

Commercial performance
In the United States, Evidence debuted at number 41 on the Billboard Top Christian Albums chart dated October 17, 2020.

Track listing

 Songwriting credits adapted from PraiseCharts.

Charts

Release history

References

External links
 

2020 albums
Josh Baldwin albums